

Belknap County

Belknap 1
Elects one representative

Belknap 2
Elects four representatives
Republican primary

General election

Belknap 3
Elects four representatives

Democratic primary

General election

Belknap 4
Elects two representatives

Belknap 5
Elects two representatives

Belknap 6
Elects two representatives
Republican primary

General election

Belknap 7
Elects one representative

Belknap 8
Elects one representative

Belknap 9
Elects one representative

Republican primary

General election

Carroll County

Carroll 1
Elects one representative

Carroll 2
Elects three representatives

Carroll 3
Elects two representatives

Carroll 4
Elects two representatives

Carroll 5
Elects three representatives

Carroll 6
Elects two representatives

Carroll 7
Elects one representative

Carroll 8
Elects one representative

Cheshire County

Cheshire 1
Elects four representatives

Cheshire 2
Elects one representative

Cheshire 3
Elects one representative

Cheshire 4
Elects one representative
No other candidate filed for the seat.

Cheshire 5
Elects one representative

Cheshire 6
Elects one representative

Cheshire 7
Elects one representative

Cheshire 8
Elects one representative
No other candidate filed for the seat.

Cheshire 9
Elects two representatives

Cheshire 10
Elects one representative

Cheshire 11
Elects two representatives

Cheshire 12
Elects two representatives

Cheshire 13
Elects one representative
Democratic primary

General election

Cheshire 14
Elects one representative
Republican primary

General election

Cheshire 15
Elects one representative

Cheshire 16
Elects two representatives
Democratic primary

Republican primary

General election

Coös County

Coös 1
Elects two representatives

Coös 2
Elects one representative

Coös 3
Elects three representatives

Coös 4
Elects one representative

Coös 5
Elects one representative

Coös 6
Elects one representative
No other candidate filed for the seat.

Coös 7
Elects one representative

Grafton County

Grafton 1
Elects two representatives

Grafton 2
Elects one representative

Grafton 3
Elects one representative

Grafton 4
Elects one representative

Grafton 5
Elects one representative
Republican primary

General election

Grafton 6
Elects one representative

Grafton 7
Elects one representative
Democratic primary

General election

Grafton 8
Elects three representatives

Grafton 9
Elects two representatives
Republican primary

Democratic primary

General election

Grafton 10
Elects one representative
No other candidate filed for the seat.

Grafton 11
Elects one representative

Grafton 12
Elects four representatives
Democratic primary

General election
No other candidate filed for the seat.

Grafton 13
Elects four representatives

Grafton 14
Elects one representative

Grafton 15
Elects one representative

Republican primary

General election

Grafton 16
Elects one representative

Grafton 17
Elects one representative

Hillsborough County

Hillsborough 1
Elects two representatives

Hillsborough 2
Elects three representatives

Hillsborough 3
Elects one representative

Hillsborough 4
Elects two representatives

Hillsborough 5
Elects two representatives

Hillsborough 6
Elects five representatives
Republican primary

General election

Hillsborough 7
Elects six representatives
Republican primary

General election

Hillsborough 8
Elects two representatives
Democratic primary

General election

Hillsborough 9
Elects two representatives

Hillsborough 10
Elects two representatives
Democratic primary

General election

Hillsborough 11
Elects two representatives
Democratic primary

General election

Hillsborough 12
Elects two representatives
Democratic primary

General election

Hillsborough 13
Elects two representatives

Hillsborough 14
Elects two representatives

Hillsborough 15
Elects two representatives

Hillsborough 16
Elects two representatives

Hillsborough 17
Elects two representatives

Hillsborough 18
Elects two representatives
Democratic primary

General election

Hillsborough 19
Elects two representatives
Republican primary

General election

Hillsborough 20
Elects two representatives

Hillsborough 21
Elects eight representatives
Republican primary

General election

Hillsborough 22
Elects three representatives
Democratic primary

 
Republican primary

General election

Hillsborough 23
Elects four representatives

Hillsborough 24
Elects two representatives
Democratic primary

General election

Hillsborough 25
Elects two representatives

Hillsborough 26
Elects two representatives
Republican primary

General election

Hillsborough 27
Elects two representatives
Democratic primary

Republican primary

General election

Hillsborough 28
Elects three representatives

Hillsborough 29
Elects three representatives

Hillsborough 30
Elects three representatives
Republican primary

General election

Hillsborough 31
Elects three representatives
Democratic primary

General election

Hillsborough 32
Elects three representatives

Hillsborough 33
Elects three representatives
Democratic primary

General election

Hillsborough 34
Elects three representatives

Hillsborough 35
Elects three representatives

Hillsborough 36
Elects three representatives
Republican primary

General election

Hillsborough 37
Elects eleven representatives
Republican primary

General election

Hillsborough 38
Elects two representatives

Hillsborough 39
Elects one representative

Hillsborough 40
Elects one representative

Hillsborough 41
Elects one representative

Hillsborough 42
Elects two representatives

Hillsborough 43
Elects three representatives
Democratic primary

General election

Hillsborough 44
Elects two representatives

Hillsborough 45
Elects two representatives
Democratic primary

General election

Merrimack County

Merrimack 1
Elects one representative

Merrimack 2
Elects two representatives
Republican primary

General election

Merrimack 3
Elects two representatives

Merrimack 4
Elects one representative

Merrimack 5
Elects two representatives

Merrimack 6
Elects two representatives

Merrimack 7
Elects one representative

Merrimack 8
Elects one representative

Merrimack 9
Elects two representatives
Democratic primary

General election

Merrimack 10
Elects three representatives
Democratic primary

General election

Merrimack 11
Elects one representative

Merrimack 12
Elects one representative

Merrimack 13
Elects one representative

Merrimack 14
Elects one representative
Democratic primary

General election

Merrimack 15
Elects one representative

Merrimack 16
Elects one representative

Merrimack 17
Elects one representative

Merrimack 18
Elects one representative

Merrimack 19
Elects one representative

Merrimack 20
Elects three representatives

Merrimack 21
Elects two representatives

Merrimack 22
Elects one representative

Merrimack 23
Elects three representatives
Democratic primary

General election

Merrimack 24
Elects four representatives

Merrimack 25
Elects one representative

Merrimack 26
Elects one representative
Democratic primary

General election

Merrimack 27
Elects two representatives

Merrimack 28
Elects one representative

Merrimack 29
Elects one representative

Rockingham County

Rockingham 1
Elects one representative
Republican primary

General election

Rockingham 2
Elects three representatives

Rockingham 3
Elects three representatives

Rockingham 4
Elects five representatives
Republican primary

General election

Rockingham 5
Elects seven representatives

Rockingham 6
Elects ten representatives
Republican primary

General election

Rockingham 7
Elects four representatives
Republican primary

General election

Rockingham 8
Elects nine representatives
Republican primary

General election

Rockingham 9
Elects two representatives

Rockingham 10
Elects one representative

Rockingham 11
Elects one representative

Rockingham 12
Elects one representative

Rockingham 13
Elects four representatives

Rockingham 14
Elects four representatives

Rockingham 15
Elects one representative

Rockingham 16
Elects one representative

Rockingham 17
Elects three representatives

Rockingham 18
Elects four representatives

Rockingham 19
Elects two representatives

Rockingham 20
Elects three representatives
Republican primary

General election

Rockingham 21
Elects four representatives.

Rockingham 22
Elects one representative

Rockingham 23
Elects one representative

Rockingham 24
Elects two representatives
Republican primary

General election

Rockingham 25
Elects one representative.
Democratic primary

General election
No other candidate filed for the seat.

Rockingham 26
Elects one representative

Rockingham 27
Elects one representative
No other candidate filed for the seat.

Rockingham 28
Elects one representative

Rockingham 29
Elects one representative.
No other candidate filed for the seat.

Rockingham 30
Elects one representative.
Democratic primary

General election

Rockingham 31
Elects one representative

Rockingham 32
Elects one representative

Rockingham 33
Elects one representative

Rockingham 34
Elects one representative

Rockingham 35
Elects one representative

Rockingham 36
Elects one representative

Rockingham 37
Elects one representative
Republican primary

General election

Strafford County

Strafford 1
Elects two representatives.
Republican primary

General election

Strafford 2
Elects two representatives

Strafford 3
Elects two representatives

Strafford 4
Elects two representatives

Strafford 5
Elects one representative

Strafford 6
Elects five representatives
Democratic primary

General election

Strafford 7
Elects one representative

Strafford 8
Elects one representative

Strafford 9
Elects one representative

Strafford 10
Elects one representative.
Republican primary

General election
No other candidate filed for the seat.

Strafford 11
Elects one representative

Strafford 12
Elects one representative

Strafford 13
Elects one representative

Strafford 14
Elects one representative.

Strafford 15
Elects one representative
Democratic primary

General election

Strafford 16
Elects one representative

Strafford 17
Elects three representatives

Strafford 18
Elects three representatives
Republican primary

General election

Strafford 19
Elects one representative

Strafford 20
Elects one representative

Strafford 21
Elects one representative

Strafford 22
Elects one representative

Strafford 23
Elects one representative

Strafford 24
Elects one representative

Strafford 25
Elects one representative

Sullivan County

Sullivan 1
Elects two representatives

Sullivan 2
Elects one representative

Sullivan 3
Elects one representative

Sullivan 4
Elects one representative

Sullivan 5
Elects one representative

Sullivan 6
Elects two representatives

Sullivan 7
Elects one representative

Sullivan 8
Elects one representative

Sullivan 9
Elects one representative

Sullivan 10
Elects one representative

Sullivan 11
Elects one representative

See also
 2020 New Hampshire elections
2020 United States elections
2020 United States Senate election in New Hampshire
2020 United States House of Representatives elections in New Hampshire
New Hampshire gubernatorial election, 2020

Notes

References

External links
 
 
  (State affiliate of the U.S. League of Women Voters)
 

2020 New Hampshire elections
New Hampshire House
New Hampshire House of Representatives elections